Douglas is a civil parish in York County, New Brunswick, Canada.

For governance purposes it is divided between the city of Fredericton and the local service districts of Estey's Bridge and the parish of Douglas, all of which are members of Regional Service Commission 11 (RSC11). Douglas Parish includes the special service areas of Carlisle Road and Lower Douglas.

Origin of name
The parish was named in honour of Sir Howard Douglas, Lieutenant Governor of New Brunswick at the time.

History
Douglas was erected in 1824 from Queensbury and Saint Marys Parish; the new parish included parts of modern Bright and Stanley Parishes and extended north only as far as the Nashwaak River. The boundary with Queensbury was adjusted in 1835, moving up the Saint John and running along a different angle in the interior. William Francis Ganong's map of 1836 parish boundaries shows a much smaller parish than today.

In 1837–38 the interior north of the Keswick River and South Branch Dunbar Stream was included in the original Stanley Parish, dissolved a year after it was erected. This put settlements along the modern Route 620 in Stanley.

In 1842 the parish was extended west to Southampton Parish, adding part of Queensbury to Douglas but also affecting unassigned lands. The northern boundary was unmentioned, implicitly extended upstream along the Nashwaak River.

In 1845 the first of a half-dozen boundary changes among the islands in the Saint John River took place. While most of these changes took place in the nineteenth century, it was 1973 before the modern boundary was finalised.

In 1847 the holdings of the New Brunswick and Nova Scotia Land Company and unassigned lands to the north were erected as a new Stanley Parish, establishing the southern part of the modern boundary with Douglas. In 1850 the unassigned area to the north of the Nashwaak River and west of Stanley was added to Douglas, an area sparsely inhabited even today.

In 1869 part of Douglas along the length of its southwestern boundary was erected as Bright Parish.

In 1952 a narrow strip of land along the eastern border was removed when the Revised Statutes updated the Territorial Division Act's boundary for Fredericton; the earlier annexation of Devon by Fredericton did not affect the parish lines in the TDA. The 1973 enlargement of Fredericton created the same situation, with the city's municipal boundaries extending into Douglas Parish but not the boundaries listed in the TDA.

Boundaries
Douglas Parish is bounded:

 on the northeast and east by a line beginning on the Carleton County line at a point about 7 kilometres east of McKiel Lake, then running south to the northeastern corner of a grant to Isaac Woodward Jouett, which is on the southern side of the Mick Road, then generally southerly following the eastern line of grants along the Currieburg Road and Route 620 to the South Branch Dunbar Stream, then downstream about 1.85 kilometres to meet the western line of Saint Marys Parish, then south about 10 kilometres to the eastern line of a grant to Daniel Sawyer, about 2.3 kilometres west of Route 148, then southeast about 5 kilometres, partly along the southwestern line of the Devon 30 Indian reserve, to meet the prolongation of Douglas Avenue, then along the prolongation and Douglas Avenue itself to the Saint John River;
 on the south by the Saint John River;
 on the west and southwest by a line running up the Keswick River to the mouth of Howard Brook, then running north 40º west to the Carleton County line;
 on the northwest by the Carleton County line;
 including Keswick, Mitchells, Upper Shores, and Lower Shores Islands and part of Sugar Island roughly north and west of the Baseline Road.

Communities
Communities at least partly within the parish. bold indicates an incorporated municipality; italics indicate a name no longer in official use

 Barton
 Birdton
 Boyds Corner
 Burtts Corner
 Cardigan
 Currieburg
 Deersdale
 Dorn Ridge
 Esteys Bridge
 Fredericksburg
 Fredericton
  Douglas
 Nashwaaksis
 Half Moon Pit
 Hamtown Corner
 Hurlett
 Jones Forks
 Keswick
 Killarney Road
 Kingsley
 Lower Stoneridge
 MacLean Settlement
 McLeod Hill
 Morehouse Corner
 Mouth of Keswick
  Napadogan
 North Tay
 Pughs Crossing
 Royal Road
 Royal Road West
 Tay Creek
 Tay Mills
 Upper Stoneridge
 Woodlands
  Zealand

Bodies of water
Bodies of water at least partly within the parish.

 Keswick River
 Nashwaak River
 The Narrows
 North Tay River
  Saint John River
 South Tay River
 Southwest Miramichi River
 Taxis River
  South Branch Becaguimec Stream
 South Branch Dunbar Stream
 Little Nashwaaksis Stream
 Nashwaaksis Stream
 Regiment Creek
 Weaver Creek
 more than thirty officially names lakes

Islands
Islands at least partly within the parish.
 Birch Island
 Keswick Island
 Lower Shores Island
 Mitchells Island
 Upper Shores Island

Other notable places
Parks, historic sites, and other noteworthy places at least partly within the parish.
 McBean Brook Protected Natural Area
 Nashwaak River Protected Natural Area
 Push and Be Damned Rapids
 Sills Brook Protected Natural Area

Demographics
Parish population total does not include portion within Fredericton

Population
Population trend

Language
Mother tongue (2016)

See also
List of parishes in New Brunswick

Notes

References

External links
 Douglas LSD
 City of Fredericton

Parishes of York County, New Brunswick
Greater Fredericton
Local service districts of York County, New Brunswick